Jessica da Silva Inchude (born 25 March 1996) is a Bissau-Guinea-born Portuguese shot putter and discus thrower.

At the 2016 African Championships she finished fourth in the shot put and ninth in the discus throw. At the 2017 Islamic Solidarity Games she won the gold medal in the discus and finished fourth in the shot put.

She competed in the women's shot put event at the 2016 Summer Olympics, where she finished 36th with a distance of 15.15 metres. She did not advance to the final. She also competed at the 2017 World Championships without reaching the final.

References

1996 births
Living people
Bissau-Guinean female athletes
Bissau-Guinean shot putters
Bissau-Guinean discus throwers
Olympic athletes of Guinea-Bissau
World Athletics Championships athletes for Guinea-Bissau
Portuguese female athletes
Portuguese shot putters
Portuguese discus throwers
Olympic athletes of Portugal
Athletes (track and field) at the 2016 Summer Olympics
Place of birth missing (living people)
Athletes (track and field) at the 2019 African Games
African Games competitors for Guinea-Bissau
World Athletics Championships athletes for Portugal